Wang Nam Khu is a sub-district in the Mueang Phitsanulok District of Phitsanulok Province, Thailand. Its name translates roughly as 'river bend palace'.

Geography
Wang Nam Khu is bordered to the north by Wat Phrik, to the east by Tha Tan of Bang Krathum District, to the south by Ban Rai of Bang Krathum District, and to the west by Ngio Ngam. The topography of the sub-district consists of flat lowlands, well suited for agriculture. Wang Nam Khu is on the Nan River.  The sub-district lies in the Nan Basin, which is part of the Chao Phraya Watershed.

History
Wang Nam Khu was settled during the Ayutthaya Period and served as the location of bases for both Thai and Burmese troops.

Economy
The present economy of Wang Nam Khu is based on agriculture (primarily rice farming) and commerce.

Administration
The following is a list of the sub-district's mubans (villages):

References

Tambon of Phitsanulok province
Populated places in Phitsanulok province